Greater Baltimore Medical Center (GBMC) is a U.S. hospital located in the Baltimore suburb of Towson, Maryland. It was opened in 1965. GBMC serves more than 20,455 inpatient cases and approximately 52,000 emergency department visits annually. GBMC's main campus also includes three medical office buildings—Physicians Pavilion East, Physicians Pavilion West and Physicians Pavilion North I. In addition to its main campus located in Towson, GBMC's care can be found in several facilities located throughout the community including Hereford, Hunt Manor, Hunt Valley, Owings Mills, Perry Hall, Lutherville, Phoenix and Timonium.

GBMC HealthCare is a private, not-for-profit corporation that owns and operates Greater Baltimore Medical Center. GBMC HealthCare  also owns and operates Gilchrist Hospice Care (formerly known as Hospice of Baltimore and Gilchrist Center for Hospice Care), the largest not-for-profit hospice organization in the state of Maryland. The organization also includes the GBMC Foundation, which supports the GBMC mission by managing fundraising efforts.

History
Incorporated in 1960, GBMC HealthCare consolidated the operations of two specialty Baltimore hospitals: The Hospital for Women of  Maryland in Baltimore City and Presbyterian Eye, Ear and Throat Charity Hospital. The services were relocated to serve the growing population in suburban Baltimore County, and GBMC opened its doors in 1965 as a regional medical center, providing general acute and specific specialized services to the northern portion of Baltimore City, most of Baltimore County, and portions of Anne Arundel, Carroll, Harford and Howard counties.

The Hospital for Women of Maryland in Baltimore City had a unique specialization, opening in 1882 in Bolton Hill as only the second women's hospital in the country (in 2001 the Hospital for Women was repurposed into the Meyerhoff House, a student housing facility for the Maryland Institute College of Art). The Presbyterian Eye, Ear and Throat Charity Hospital originated as a clinic in the Civil War surgeon's East Baltimore carriage house in 1887.

Gilchrist Hospice Care
Gilchrist Hospice Care, a Medicare/Medicaid-certified hospice program, is the largest not-for-profit hospice organization in the state of Maryland. Since 1994, it has provided care and services to over 17,000 terminally ill individuals who reside in Baltimore City and Baltimore, Carroll, Harford, and Howard counties. Care includes medical, nursing, social work, home health aid, spiritual and bereavement counseling/support and volunteer assistance. Hospice services are most often provided in the patient's home or place of residence. When more intensive medical care is required, patients may be admitted to a 24-bed inpatient hospice facility, located on the campus of GBMC.

GBMC Foundation
Founded in 1987,  the GBMC Foundation is a 501(c)(3) nonprofit organization established to centralize and coordinate fundraising efforts to benefit GBMC HealthCare. The Foundation executes fundraising events, annual appeals, and capital campaigns and seeks gifts from grateful patients and other friends of GBMC HealthCare,  as well as grants from corporations and private foundations. The Foundation does not have any affiliation with federated funds or public agencies, instead relying on the generous financial support of people across Maryland and beyond. The GBMC Foundation is registered with the state of Maryland as an approved charitable organization. Gifts to the GBMC Foundation support new facilities, equipment for GBMC physicians and staff, specialty programs and technologies that combine to make GBMC the community hospital of choice for residents of Central Maryland.

Johns Hopkins medicine affiliation
In 2007, GBMC and Johns Hopkins Medicine began a strategic clinical affiliation for several programs, beginning with cardiology, pediatric surgery and oncology. Additional joint clinical practices, shared satellite healthcare centers and collaboration on clinical research are possibilities for future expansion of this affiliation. The $4 billion JHM enterprise is one of the largest employers in Maryland.  Its components consistently are named at the top of national rankings for best hospital and best school of medicine, and its faculty consistently win the largest share of NIH research funds.

References

External links
 

Hospital buildings completed in 1965
Hospitals in Baltimore County, Maryland
Baltimore County, Maryland landmarks